Alicia Janz (born 25 May 1990) is a former Australian rules football and netball player who played in the AFL Women's competition and ANZ Championship.

Early Life
Janz was born in Katherine, Northern Territory to a Papua New Guinean and Torres Strait Islander mother and Australian father. She is of Meriam Mer ancestry. Janz was raised in Derby, Western Australia where she was first introduced to Australian rules football, playing informally with other locals. She attended Methodist Ladies' College, Perth. 

Janz played netball for both West Coast Fever and 
Western Sting. It wasn't until she moved to Melbourne in 2014 that she switched from netball to playing with the Darebin Falcons in the VWFL before moving back to Perth and playing with Swan Districts in the WAWFL.

AFLW Career
Janz was recruited by Fremantle as an injury replacement player during the 2017 season. She made her debut in the one point loss to Collingwood at Rushton Park in round five of the 2017 season. She played every match after her debut game to finish with three matches for the season. She was delisted at the end of the 2017 season. She returned to Fremantle's list in October through the 2017 AFL Women's draft.

In April 2019, Janz joining cross-town rivals West Coast for their inaugural season. Janz was delisted by the Eagles on 9 June 2021, after playing 6 games with the team throughout her career.

References

External links 

1990 births
Living people
Fremantle Football Club (AFLW) players
Australian rules footballers from Western Australia
Indigenous Australian players of Australian rules football
Australian netball players
Netball players from Western Australia
West Coast Fever players
Western Sting players
Australian Netball League players
West Australian Netball League players

West Coast Eagles (AFLW) players
Indigenous Australian netball players